Conquers Your Love is the second studio album by Praga Khan. It was released in 1996 and featured many songs from his previous album, A Spoonful of Miracle, some of them in different mixes. The songs "Injected with a Poison", "Phantasia Forever", "Moonday", and "Love Me Baby" are different mixes than those on A Spoonful of Miracle.

Track listing
Producers: Oliver Adams and Praga Khan.

References

1996 albums
Praga Khan albums